|}

The Lincoln Handicap is a flat handicap horse race in Great Britain open to horses aged four years or older. It is run over a distance of 1 mile (1,609 metres) at Doncaster in late March or early April.

It is traditionally the feature event on the first Saturday of Britain's turf flat racing season. It usually takes place one or two weeks before the Grand National, and for betting purposes the two races form the Spring Double. The only jockey to have ever won both legs was Dave Dick in 1956.

History
An event called the Lincolnshire Handicap was established at Lincoln in 1849. It was run over a distance of 2 miles in August.

The venue introduced the Lincoln Spring Handicap at a new fixture in March 1853. The first two runnings were over 1½ miles, and it was shortened to a mile in 1855. The summer race ended when the meeting was temporarily discontinued in the 1850s. The spring version was renamed the Lincolnshire Handicap in 1860.

The race continued to be held at Lincoln until 1964. It was transferred to Doncaster in 1965, following the closure of its former venue. From this point it was known as the Lincoln Handicap.

The bookmaker William Hill supported the Lincoln Handicap for several years prior to 1997. The company started a new period of sponsorship in 2006 which ran until 2014, and from 2015 to 2017 the race was sponsored by the bookmakers Betway. In 2018, it was sponsored by 32Red and since 2019 Unibet have sponsored the race.

The names of the winning horses from 1926 (King of Clubs) to 1937 (Marmaduke Jinks) are used in the Waddingtons board game Totopoly.

Records
Most successful horse (2 wins):
 Ob – 1906, 1907
 Babur – 1957, 1958

Leading jockey (4 wins):
 Charlie Maidment – Indigestion (1868), Royal Rake (1870), Guy Dayrell (1872), Vestminster (1873)

Leading trainer (4 wins):
 Jack Robinson – Clorane (1896), Winkfield's Pride (1897), Prince Barcaldine (1898), Cinderello (1910)
 William Haggas - High Low (1992), Very Wise (2007), Penitent (2010), Addeybb (2018)

Winners since 1965
 Weights given in stones and pounds.

Earlier winners

 1853: Caurire
 1854: Georgey
 1855: Saucebox
 1856: Flageolet
 1857: Huntingdon
 1858: Vandermulin
 1859: Bel Esperanza
 1860: Vigo
 1861: Benbow
 1862: Suburban
 1863: Manrico
 1864: Benjamin
 1865: Gaily
 1866: Treasure Trove
 1867: Vandervelde
 1868: Indigestion
 1869: Sycee
 1870: Royal Rake
 1871: Vulcan
 1872: Guy Dayrell
 1873: Vestminster
 1874: Tomahawk
 1875: The Gunner
 1876: Controversy
 1877: Footstep
 1878: Kaleidoscope
 1879: Touchet
 1880: Rosy Cross
 1881: Buchanan
 1882: Poulet
 1883: Knight of Burghley
 1884: Tonans
 1885: Bendigo
 1886: Fulmen
 1887: Oberon
 1888: Veracity
 1889: Wise Man
 1890: The Rejected
 1891: Lord George
 1892: Clarence
 1893: Wolf's Crag
 1894: Le Nicham
 1895: Euclid
 1896: Clorane
 1897: Winkfield's Pride
 1898: Prince Barcaldine
 1899: General Peace
 1900: Sir Geoffrey
 1901: Little Eva
 1902: St Maclou
 1903: Over Norton
 1904: Uninsured
 1905: Sansovino
 1906: Ob
 1907: Ob
 1908: Kaffir Chief
 1909: Duke of Sparta
 1910: Cinderello
 1911: Mercutio
 1912: Long Set
 1913: Berrilldon
 1914: Outram
 1915: View Law
 1916: Clap Gate *
 1917–18: no race
 1919: Royal Bucks
 1920: Furious
 1921: Soranus
 1922: Granely
 1923: White Bud
 1924: Sir Gallahad
 1925: Tapin
 1926: King of Clubs
 1927: Priory Park
 1928: Dark Warrior
 1929: Elton
 1930: Leonidas
 1931: Knight Error
 1932: Jerome Fandor
 1933: Dorigen
 1934: Play On
 1935: Flamenco
 1936: Over Coat
 1937: Marmaduke Jinks
 1938: Phakos
 1939: Squadron Castle
 1940: Quartier-Maitre
 1941: Gloaming
 1942: Cuerdley **
 1943: Lady Electra **
 1944: Backbite **
 1945: Double Harness**
 1946: Langton Abbot
 1947: Jockey Treble
 1948: Commissar
 1949: Fair Judgement
 1950: Dramatic
 1951: Barnes Park
 1952: Phariza
 1953: Sailing Light
 1954: Nahar
 1955: Military Court
 1956: Three Star
 1957: Babur
 1958: Babur
 1959: Marshal Pil
 1960: Mustavon
 1961: Johns Court
 1962: Hill Royal
 1963: Monawin
 1964: Mighty Gurkha

* The 1916 running took place at Lingfield Park.** The 1942 run as "Northern Lincoln", 1943, 1944 and 1945 (run as "Substitute Lincoln") editions were held at Pontefract.

Broadcasters
Network TV
BBC Television televised the race from 1959 to 1964 inclusive.
ITV televised from 1965-1985 and 2017–present
Channel 4 televised from 1986-2016
Pay TV
The Racing Channel 1995-2002
Racing UK showed it in 2005-2006
At The Races/Sky Sports Racing 2003-2004 and 2007–present

See also
 Horse racing in Great Britain
 List of British flat horse races
 Recurring sporting events established in 1853 – this race is included under its original title, Lincoln Spring Handicap.

References

 Paris-Turf:
 Racing Post:
 galopp-sieger.de – Lincoln Handicap (Lincolnshire Handicap).
 pedigreequery.com – Lincoln(shire) Handicap – Doncaster.
 
 

Open mile category horse races
Doncaster Racecourse
Flat races in Great Britain